Balarama (born c. 1958) was the lead elephant of the world-famous Mysore Dasara procession and carried the idol of goddess Chamundeshwari on the fabled Golden Howdah for a thirteen times between 1999 and 2011. Balarama is a bull born about 1958 and is accompanied in the procession by other Dasara Elephants. Of the many (about 16) elephants participating, Balarama was one of the star attraction when he carried on his back the sacred idol of goddess Chamundeshwari in the  golden howdah on the auspicious 10th day of Dasara celebrations.

History 
Balarama was captured in 1987 in the Kattepura forest near Somwarpet, in the Kodagu region of Karnataka. Balarama has taken part in the Dasara procession since 1994, carrying the golden howdah. A very silent bull (against the norm for elephants), he is said to be an introvert, and has to have special training so he can withstand the firing of canons that occurs during the festival.

He succeeded Drona as the carrier of the Golden Howdah.

Balarama was not the first choice to carry the Howdah after Drona. Elephant Arjuna, a 44-year-old bull weighing  was supposed to be the carrier of the howdah, but was sidelined for accidentally killing a Mahout. One day, Arjuna went to bathe in a river with elephant Bahadur and Bahadur's trainer Annayya. While crossing a road, the elephants were startled by a vehicle and in the chaos that ensued, the rider Annayya fell down to the ground, only to be stamped on the head by Arjuna. He was crushed to death. People opined that an elephant that had killed a man was unfit to carry the religious duties of Dasara. So Arjuna, while being as capable as Drona, was not given the honorable duty, though he did have the honour of carrying the Chinnada Ambari once before being replaced by Balarama. Balarama has now been rested from the duty of carrying the Golden Howdah due to his reducing weight and has been succeeded by Arjuna. Balarama now leads the procession as the 'nishane aane' or the lead elephant.

Balarama's Mahout Sannappa once refused to mount Balarama after his family were stopped by the police from watching him ride during Dasara.

Balarama refuses food given to him by anybody other than his Mahout. Balarama weighs about 4590 Kilograms and he conquers the hearts of human beings by his majestic looks and the silence that he possess. He is looked after at the Morkal Elephant camp at Nagarahole national park and his previous mahout Sannappa has retired and his new master Thimma has taken over.

See also
 List of individual elephants

References

External links 
Balarama: A Royal Elephant, Ted & Besty Lewin, Lee & Low Books, 2009-08-01, .
Colour photo and news article
News article from Mysoresamachar
Deccan Herald
Udayavaani

Individual elephants
Culture of Mysore
Elephants in India